Asakura (written: 朝倉, 浅倉, 麻倉) is a Japanese surname. Notable people with the surname include:

Real People
Asakura clan, famous Japanese clan during Sengoku period
Asakura Yoshikage (1533–1573), daimyō
Daisuke Asakura, Japanese pop artist
George Asakura, Japanese manga artist
Noriyuki Asakura, composer
, a Japanese film actress

Fictional characters
Kasumi Asakura, of Rose Hip Rose.
Kazumi Asakura, from Negima!: Magister Negi Magi.
Minami Asakura and Toshio Asakura in Touch
Ryoko Asakura, from the Suzumiya Haruhi series.
Takeshi Asakura, aka Kamen Rider Ouja, the main villain from the Tokusatsu TV series Kamen Rider Ryuki.
Yoh Asakura, from Shaman King Yoh Asakura's relatives:
Hao Asakura (older twin brother)
Keiko Asakura (mother)
Kino Asakura (grandmother)
Mikihisa Asakura (father)
Yohmei Asakura (grandfather)
Yohken Asakura (ancestor)
Akio Asakura, a main character in Wangan Midnight.
Amanda Asakura, a main character in Angel Heart.
Junichi Asakura, of the D.C.: Da Capo series Junichi's relatives:
Nemu Asakura (adopted sister and, later, wife)
Otome Asakura (granddaughter), character from D.C. II: Da Capo II
Yume Asakura (granddaughter), character from D.C. II: Da Capo II

See also
Asakura, Ehime, Ehime Prefecture, Japan
Asakura, Fukuoka, Fukuoka Prefecture, Japan
Asakura District, Fukuoka, Fukuoka Prefecture, Japan (former district)

Japanese-language surnames